Hero is a 2015 Japanese mystery comedy-drama film directed by Masayuki Suzuki (ja) and based on the Japanese television drama series of the same name. It was released on July 18, 2015.

Plot
A simple hit and run turns out to be anything but when prosecutor Kohei Kuryu realises the victim was a witness in a case against the yakuza.

Cast
Takuya Kimura as Kohei Kuryu
Keiko Kitagawa as Chika Asagi 
Takako Matsu as Maiko Amamiya
Kōichi Satō
Tetta Sugimoto
Gaku Hamada
Bokuzō Masana
Yō Yoshida
Yōji Tanaka
Katsuya
Yutaka Matsushige
Norito Yashima
Fumiyo Kohinata

Reception
The film was number-one on its opening weekend, grossing .

References

External links
 

2010s mystery comedy-drama films
Films based on television series
Films produced by Kazutoshi Wadakura
Films with screenplays by Yasushi Fukuda
Japanese mystery comedy-drama films
2015 comedy films
2015 drama films
2015 films
Films scored by Takayuki Hattori
Hero (2001 TV series)
2010s Japanese films